The fifth season of The Wonder Years aired on ABC from October 2, 1991 to May 13, 1992. During this season, many changes took place on the show. For example, Kevin and Paul go to new separate schools and Kevin's voice changes. This season took place during Kevin's 1971–72 school year.

Episodes

References

1991 American television seasons
1992 American television seasons
The Wonder Years seasons
Television series set in 1971
Television series set in 1972